Jarkko Nieminen and Dmitry Tursunov were the defending champions, but Tursunov chose to play in Oeiras instead. Nieminen partnered up with Rameez Junaid but lost in the quarterfinals to Eric Butorac and Raven Klaasen.

Jamie Murray and John Peers won the title, defeating Colin Fleming and Ross Hutchins in the final, 6–4, 6–2.

Seeds

Draw

Draw

References
 Main Draw

BMW Openandnbsp;- Doubles
2014 BMW Open